Pisidium tenuilineatum, the fine-lined pea mussel, is a species of very small freshwater bivalve in the family Sphaeriidae.

Distribution
The species is native to Europe.

 British Isles – listed in List of endangered species in the British Isles. It is rare in Great Britain.
 Czech Republic – in Bohemia, in Moravia, critically endangered
 Denmark
 Germany – high endangered (Stark gefährdet)
 Poland – Near Threatened (NT, mentioned as lower risk LR)
 Netherlands
 Slovakia – a rare species
 Sweden
 and other states

References

Further reading
 Kuiper J.G.J. (1981). "The distribution of Pisidium tenuilineatum Stelfox and Pisidium annandalei Prashad in the Mediterranean area". Basteria, Leiden, 45: 79-84.

tenuilineatum
Bivalves described in 1918
Bivalves of Europe